is a 2012 Japanese animated film based on the Jewelpet series by Sanrio and Sega. Sweets Dance Princess features an original story set in an alternate universe from the Jewelpet TV series. The film was directed by Hiroaki Sakurai (Daa! Daa! Daa!, Cromartie High School) and written by Takashi Yamada (Ojamajo Doremi). The film was released in Japan on August 11, 2012. DVD and Blu-ray versions of the film were released by Toho on January 25, 2013.

Development
The film was first announced in February 2012 and it formally introduces the Sweetspets, who first appeared in the anime Jewelpet Sunshine, as well as other characters exclusively created for the film. A short 30 second trailer of the film was streamed on March 1, 2012. A press conference of the film was held on March 30, 2012 which occurred at the Imperial Hotel, Tokyo to promote the film. Along the guest stars were child actress Mana Ashida and the designer of Hello Kitty, Yuko Yamaguchi. Yamaguchi stated that Ashida's singing and dancing is both cute and energetic and fits well with the film's theme. When released in cinemas, the film was double-billed with the short film Onegai My Melody: Yu & Ai.

Plot
Ruby and some of her friends are all headed to Sweets Land, the home of the Sweetspets, to celebrate her birthday with a special dance. However, during the preparations, a strange thing falls from the skies, containing a Sweetspet boy named Gumimin. Unknown to everyone, he may be the only one who can save Sweets Land from impending chaos, and eat all the sweets in Sweets Land to help save it.

Cast

Main characters

Guest characters
 Mana Ashida as : The daughter of the rulers of the Sweetsland Kingdom, Mana is born on Sweetsland who is celebrating her seventh birthday. Despite being born in a high class, Mana is down to earth with everyone. She is an aspiring manga artist and also loves cake and dancing. She also wields a crown that allows her to collect and use magic from the Sweetspets, amplifying it.
 Hiroki Shimowada as : Duke Creme de Brûlée is the young duke of the Sweetsland Kingdom, who wanted the whole kingdom for himself. He has a secret agenda and wants Mana's affections while overthrowing the kingdom.  Chocolat is one of his agents, sent to spy over Ruby's friends. He is also responsible for sending Gumimin's to Ruby's friends, with the problem with his memories being erased.
 Yumiko Kobayashi as  / : A Fennec fox Sweetspet who came down from the skies of Sweetsland during Ruby's and her friends dance practice. In his first appearance, he suffers from Amnesia and has recollection on who he is, so he is named Park by his friends. Park tends to be airhead and also likes all types of sweets, but also wants to be supportive to Ruby. The Duke is taking interests on him as he is later revealed to be a Legendary Sweetspet. Yuko stated that Gumimin's motif is Gummy candy during the film's press conference.

Music
The music was composed by Wataru Maeguchi, who composed the soundtrack in the anime series Hayate the Combat Butler: Can't Take My Eyes Off You and Suzy's Zoo Daisuki! Witzy.

The film's opening song is titled  and the ending theme is titled , both performed by the Japanese Child Actress and Singer Mana Ashida. "Friends Forever and Ever" is also the ending song of the fourth Jewelpet Series Jewelpet Kira☆Deco! that was released on May 16, 2012 while "Magic of Dreams" is an entirely new song especially composed for the film. The film's official soundtrack album, titled  was released on August 8, 2012.

Reception
The film was a box-office failure, scoring at No. 14 on Box Office Mojo's chart and earning US$355,395 on 106 screens from August 11–12. It then fell from the list a week later.

References

External links
 Official Film Website 
 

2012 anime films
2012 animated films
Toho animated films
Jewelpet
Magical girl anime and manga